Maryland's Legislative District 38 is one of 47 districts in the state for the Maryland General Assembly. It covers Somerset County, Worcester County and part of Wicomico County. The district is divided into three sub-districts for the Maryland House of Delegates: District 38A, District 38B and District 38C.

Demographic characteristics
As of the 2020 United States census, the district had a population of 131,889, of whom 107,520 (81.5%) were of voting age. The racial makeup of the district was 90,597 (68.7%) White, 26,691 (20.2%) African American, 472 (0.4%) Native American, 3,239 (2.5%) Asian, 32 (0.0%) Pacific Islander, 3,547 (2.7%) from some other race, and 7,303 (5.5%) from two or more races. Hispanic or Latino of any race were 6,890 (5.2%) of the population.

The district had 87,103 registered voters as of October 17, 2020, of whom 16,196 (18.6%) were registered as unaffiliated, 36,708 (42.1%) were registered as Republicans, 32,749 (37.6%) were registered as Democrats, and 879 (1.0%) were registered to other parties.

Political representation
The district is represented for the 2023–2027 legislative term in the State Senate by Mary Beth Carozza (R) and in the House of Delegates by Charles J. Otto (R, District 38A), Carl L. Anderton Jr. (R, District 38B) and Wayne A. Hartman (R, District 38C).

History

1994 redistricting
On January 14, 1994, Maryland was ordered to submit a plan for a new African American majority district on the Eastern Shore following Marylanders for Fair Representation, Inc. v. Schaefer. The U.S. District Court approved a plan to alter the boundaries of former legislative districts 36, 37, and 38, beginning with the 1994 general election. Following this, Somerset County, Worcester County and part of Wicomico County were provisioned for district 38.

References

Somerset County, Maryland
Worcester County, Maryland
Wicomico County, Maryland
38